The 1965 Trophées de France season was the second season of the Trophées de France Formula 2 championship. The season was dominated by Jim Clark, winning three out of the four events, driving a Lotus 35-Cosworth for Ron Harris Team Lotus. Jochen Rindt in a Roy Winkelmann Brabham BT16-Cosworth was the only other race winner, narrowly beating Frank Gardner's Lola T60 to the flag in the Reims Grand Prix in a race where only six-tenths of a second covered the top four finishers.

Trophées de France
Champion:  Jim Clark

Runner Up:  Jochen Rindt

Results

Table

References

Trophées de France seasons